Ao Luek is a district (amphoe) in Krabi province, Thailand.

Geography
Neighbouring districts are (from the North clockwise): Plai Phraya, Khao Phanom, and west Thap Put. To the south it borders Phang Nga Bay, to the East is Mueang Krabi of Krabi province.

Than Bok Khorani National Park was established on 30 September 1998 and covers 104 km2 of coastal limestone hills and 23 islands off the coast. In the national park is the skull cave (Tham Hua Kalok), containing prehistoric paintings. At a cave in Ao Luek Nuea, Yai Ruak Cave, fossils of 700,000 year-old Javan rhinoceros and hyenas have been found.

History
In 1917, the district's name was changed from Pak Lao (ปากลาว) to Ao Luek.

Administration

Central administration 
Ao Luek is divided into nine sub-districts (tambons), which are further subdivided into 52 administrative villages (mubans).

Local administration 
There are two sub-district municipalities (thesaban sambons) in the district:
 Laem Sak consisting of parts of sub-district Laem Sak.
 Ao Luek Tai consisting of parts of sub-districts Ao Luek Tai and Ao Luek Nuea.

There are nine sub-district administrative organizations (SAO) in the district:
 Ao Luek Tai consisting of parts of sub-district Ao Luek Tai.
 Laem Sak consisting of parts of sub-district Laem Sak.
 Na Nuea consisting of sub-district Na Nuea.
 Khlong Hin consisting of sub-district Khlong Hin.
 Ao Luek Noi consisting of sub-district Ao Luek Noi.
 Ao Luek Nuea consisting of parts of sub-district Ao Luek Nuea.
 Khao Yai consisting of sub-district Khao Yai.
 Khlong Ya consisting of sub-district Khlong Ya.
 Ban Klang consisting of sub-district Ban Klang.

References

External links
amphoe.com on Ao Luek

Districts of Krabi province